Chokishgna (also, Chokisgna) is a former Tongva-Gabrieleño Native American settlement in Los Angeles County, California. In the late 17th century, the village declined with the growth of Mission San Gabriel, located at the site of the nearby village of Toviscanga in 1776. It was located at the later site of a  established in 1832 by Lemuel Carpenter, current Bell Gardens, California.

See also
Category: Tongva populated places
Tongva language
California mission clash of cultures

References

Tongva populated places
Bell Gardens, California
Former settlements in Los Angeles County, California
Former Native American populated places in California